Started in September 2008, JInsider is a Jewish media brand encompassing the video aggregation website JInsider, a weekly column in the New York Jewish Week, several documentary film projects and a variety of analysis projects. JInsider.com showcases Jewish web videos and seeks to serve as the web archive of record for Jewish video content. JInsider's weekly column has sparked discussion on topics such as the free services model and how “free” affects the Jewish community.

JInsider was cofounded by Yaakov (Jeffrey) Greenman and Mark Pearlman. Pearlman was vice president of corporate development at CBS from 1988 to 1995, and Fox News executive vice president of finance and operations from 1995 to 1997. He was part of the original management team that launched the Fox News Channel under Roger Ailes in 1996. Pearlman is also the former Chairman of the Children's Museum of Manhattan and has funded and directed other Jewish community initiatives including the website Sinai Live and the MyHatikva initiative for the State of Israel.

Documentary Projects
JInsider frequently interviews prominent members of the Jewish community such as Neal Shapiro, Malcolm Hoenlein and Joseph Telushkin and showcases them in a Top Jew series.  Their largest project to date involved the production and airing of the Traveler's Guide for Uncertain Times - a documentary offering wisdom for navigating the economic crisis.

Analysis Projects and Think Tanks
JInsider has completed three metric studies on the Jewish community: "The Jewish GDP," "The Jewish Internet Metric Study" and "The Jewish Day School Study."

The Jewish GDP study focused on the basic economics of the Jewish community, specifically the distribution and balance of funds throughout Jewish non-profit organizations. The study, completed in the first quarter of 2009, presented the following results:

 The Jewish GDP is $10billion ($6.7billion if the two main financial intermediaries - Jewish Federation and the Jewish Communal Fund - are excluded). This is not an exact number because many large Jewish organizations such as Chabad and the Orthodox Union are not required to file public financial information.
 Looking at the net GDP of $6.7 billion, most funds go to social welfare (36 percent), followed by education (32 percent). Seventeen percent of services provided go for communal life, with 4 percent for advocacy, 2 percent for the arts, and less than 1 percent for Arab-Israel relations.
 More than 25 percent of all funds come through the Jewish federation system, and 30 percent of all revenue is concentrated among the top 10 nonprofits, including UJA-Federation of New York, the Jewish Agency for Israel, Hadassah, American Jewish Joint Distribution Committee, Yeshiva University, FEGS Health and Human Service System, and the Jewish Geriatric Center.

The Jewish Internet Metric Study looked at three major aspects of the Jewish Web: News sites, Information/Education sites, and Search. The study, completed June 2009, presented the following results:

 Overall traffic to major Jewish news and educational/information sites is rising.
 In the news category, there is no dominant U.S. site, though together the six major U.S. news sites in this study attract roughly 800,000 unique visitors per month. This is above the approximately 700,000 unique visitors the Israeli site haaretz.com receives per month, but below the 1.45 million jpost.com receives.
 In the education/information category there are a number of strong sites, with Chabad emerging as a brand leader
 Overall search traffic for Jewish terms is steadily declining

The report also included a recommendation to the Jewish news industry that the industry coordinate their assets in an online consortium to boost efficiency and sustainability.

In addition, JInsider has organized and sponsored a think-tank discussion with Jewish community leaders on the direction and goals of the community

Notes

External links
JInsider Homepage
JInsider articles in The Jewish Week

Jewish culture
Jewish websites
News aggregators